Nationalist socialism may refer to:
 Left-wing nationalism, a form of nationalism with socialist characteristics that is sometimes referred to as nationalist socialism
 Nazism, a form of German nationalism and fascism promoted in Germany by the Nazi Party

See also 
 National Socialism (disambiguation)